Attorney General White may refer to:

John White (Frontenac County) (1760s–1800), Attorney General of Upper Canada
Mark White (Texas politician) (1940–2017), Attorney General of Texas
Robert White (attorney general) (1833–1915), Attorney General of West Virginia

See also
William Pinkney Whyte (1824–1908), Attorney General of Maryland
General White (disambiguation)